The 1971 Australian Rally Championship was a series of five rallying events held across Australia. It was the fourth season in the history of the competition.

Colin Bond and navigator George Shepheard in the Holden Dealer Team Holden Torana GTR XU-1 were the winners of the 1971 Championship.

Season review

The fourth Australian Rally Championship was decided over five events, staged across the Eastern States of Australia with two events in New South Wales and one each in Queensland, Victoria and South Australia.  The series was the start of the domination of the Holden Dealer Team Holden Torana GTR XU-1 of Colin Bond and George Shepheard.  The Renault R8 Gordinis which had won the previous year were the only team to present any real challenge to the Toranas.

The Rallies

The five events of the 1971 season were as follows.

Round Three – Snowy Mountains Rally

Round Five – Warana Rally

1971 Drivers and Navigators Championships
Final pointscore for 1971 is as follows.

Colin Bond – Champion Driver 1971

George Shepheard – Champion Navigator 1971

References

External links
  Results of Snowy Mountains Rally and ARC results.

Rally Championship
Rally competitions in Australia
1971 in rallying